Hohenzollernplatz may refer to:

 Hohenzollernplatz (Berlin U-Bahn)
 Hohenzollernplatz (Munich U-Bahn)